The 1907–08 Harvard Crimson men's ice hockey season was the 11th season of play for the program.

Season
For the second consecutive season Harvard finished second in the Intercollegiate Hockey Association, losing their only conference game to league champion Yale. The match was the first victory for the Bulldogs over the Crimson in nearly six years.

Roster

Standings

Schedule and Results

|-
!colspan=12 style=";" | Regular Season

References

Harvard Crimson men's ice hockey seasons
Harvard
Harvard
Harvard
Harvard
Harvard